Tambaram (Tamil: தாம்பரம்), is a southern neighbourhood of Chennai, Tamil Nadu, India.

Tambaram may also refer to

Places in Tamil Nadu, India
 Tambaram Municipal Corporation, a city in the Chennai Metropolitan Area
 Tambaram taluk, a taluk of Chengalpattu district
 Tambaram division, a revenue division in the Kanchipuram district
 Tambaram Sanatorium, a neighborhood in Chennai
 Tambaram railway station, a railway station in South Chennai 
 Tambaram Air Force Station, an Air Force Station in Chennai

Other
 Tambaram Lalitha (died 1983), Tamil actress
 Tambaram (state assembly constituency), a state assembly constituency of Tamil Nadu, India